The Assistant to the President for National Security Affairs (APNSA), commonly referred to as the National Security Advisor (NSA), is a senior aide in the Executive Office of the President, based at the West Wing of the White House. The National Security Advisor serves as the principal advisor to the President of the United States on all national security issues. 

The National Security Advisor participates in meetings of the National Security Council (NSC) and usually chairs meetings of the Principals Committee of the NSC with the Secretary of State and Secretary of Defense (those meetings not attended by the President). The NSA also sits on the Homeland Security Council (HSC). The National Security Advisor is supported by NSC staff who produce classified research and briefings for the National Security Advisor to review and present, either to the NSC or the President.

The National Security Advisor is appointed by the President and does not require confirmation by the United States Senate. An appointment of a three- or four-star General to the role requires Senate confirmation to maintain that rank in the new position.

Role
The influence and role of the National Security Advisor varies from administration to administration and depends not only on the qualities of the person appointed to the position, but also on the style and management philosophy of the incumbent president. Ideally, the National Security Advisor serves as an honest broker of policy options for the president in the field of national security, rather than as an advocate for his or her own policy agenda.

The National Security Advisor is a staff position in the Executive Office of the President and does not have line or budget authority over either the Department of State or the Department of Defense, unlike the Secretary of State and the Secretary of Defense, who are Senate-confirmed officials with statutory authority over their departments. The National Security Advisor is able to offer daily advice (due to the proximity) to the president independently of the vested interests of the large bureaucracies and clientele of those departments.

In times of crisis, the National Security Advisor is likely to operate from the White House Situation Room or the Presidential Emergency Operations Center (as on September 11, 2001), updating the president on the latest events in a crisis situation.

History

The National Security Council was created at the start of the Cold War under the National Security Act of 1947 to coordinate defense, foreign affairs, international economic policy, and intelligence; this was part of a large reorganization that saw the creation of the Department of Defense and the Central Intelligence Agency. The Act did not create the position of the National Security Advisor per se, but it did create an executive secretary in charge of the staff. In 1949, the NSC became part of the Executive Office of the President.

Robert Cutler was the first National Security Advisor in 1953, and held the job twice, both times during the Eisenhower administration. The system has remained largely unchanged since then, particularly since President John Kennedy, with powerful National Security Advisors and strong staff but a lower importance given to formal NSC meetings. This continuity persists despite the tendency of each new president to replace the advisor and senior NSC staff.

President Richard Nixon's National Security Advisor, Henry Kissinger, enhanced the importance of the role, controlling the flow of information to the president and meeting with him multiple times per day. Kissinger also holds the distinction of serving as National Security Advisor and Secretary of State at the same time from September 22, 1973, until November 3, 1975. He holds the record for longest term of service (2,478 days); Michael Flynn holds the record for shortest term, at just 24 days.

Brent Scowcroft held the job in two non-consecutive administrations: the Ford administration and the George H. W. Bush administration.

List

See also 
White House Chief of Staff
Homeland Security Council
Homeland Security Advisor

Notes

References

Further reading
Falk, Stanley L., "The National Security Council under Truman, Eisenhower, and Kennedy". Political Science Quarterly 79.3 (1964): 403–434. online
 George, Robert Z. and Rishikof, Harvey, eds., The National Security Enterprise: Navigating the Labyrinth (2nd ed.: Georgetown University Press, 2017). Excerpt 
 Preston, Andrew, "The Little State Department: McGeorge Bundy and the National Security Council Staff, 1961‐65". Presidential Studies Quarterly 31.4 (2001): 635–659. Online
 Rothkopf, David, Running the world: The inside story of the National Security Council and the architects of American power. (PublicAffairs, 2009).

External links
 WhiteHouse.gov/NSC

Assistants to the President of the United States
United States National Security Council
United States diplomacy